Santiago de María is a municipality in the Usulután department of El Salvador. It has one of the strongest economies in El Salvador due to small private businesses and an entrepreneurial culture.

Municipalities of the Usulután Department